'''Simmons Energy | A Division of Piper Jaffrey is an independent investment bank specializing in the energy industry, offering M&A advisory, capital markets execution and investment research. Simmons & Company International has offices in Houston, Aberdeen, London, and Dubai. Simmons & Company International was founded in 1974 by Matthew R. Simmons with the focus of providing financial advisory services to the energy service sector. In 2009, Matt Simmons retired to become "Emeritus Chairman".  As of June 16, 2010, Matt Simmons retired from the company.Simmons Energy | A Division of Piper Jaffrey, Formerly Simmons & Company International, Energy'' Specialists of Piper Jaffray, announced a rebranding and name change on October 24, 2018.

Simmons employs approximately 150 individuals and is active in the energy services and equipment, midstream/downstream, exploration and production, and alternative energy sectors. From January 2008 to September 2012, Simmons & Company completed 167 transactions totaling approximately $34 billion in value, with a majority of its focus towards M&A transactions.

Clients of Simmons & Co have included energy companies such as FMC Technologies and Hunting PLC.

On October 21, 2019, it was reported Simmons Energy had performed a layoff of a majority of their upstream oil and gas acquisition and divestitures (A&D) team with the retirement of Jay Boudreaux, head of upstream A&D at the end of 2019.

References

External links 
Simmons & Company International

Companies based in Houston
Investment banks